Reyes Holdings, LLC is an American foodservice wholesaler, distributor and bottler that ranks as the 7th largest privately held company in the United States, with annual sales in excess of $40B USD. Operations span  North, Central and South America, as well as Europe, the Middle East and Asia Pacific. Reyes Holdings subdivisions include Reyes Beverage Group, the largest beer distributor in the United States, Martin Brower, McDonald's largest global distributor and Reyes Coca-Cola Bottling, a midwest and west coast bottler and distributor. The company is based in Rosemont, Illinois, a suburb of Chicago.

Operations

Beer distribution 
Reyes Beverage Group is  the largest beer distribution organization in the United States representing import, craft and domestic beer brands. The beer distribution operations within Reyes Holdings, LLC, are collectively known as Reyes Beverage Group, distributing over 272M+ cases of beer to 100K+ customers annually.  The beer distribution operations within Reyes Beverage Group are:

Reyes Beverage Group features brands from Constellation Brands, MillerCoors, Boston Beer Company, Heineken Brands, the Lagunitas Brewing Company, Yuengling, and many more brands.

Coca-Cola 
Reyes Holdings distributes Coca-Cola brands under the wholly owned subsidiary Reyes Coca-Cola Bottling. Reyes Holdings merged a second subsidiary, Great Lakes Coca-Cola, into Reyes Coca-Cola Bottling effective January 1, 2022. Reyes Coca-Cola has 59 facilities servicing Chicago, Illinois, Northwest Indiana, Michigan, Wisconsin, southern Minnesota, California, Las Vegas, Nevada, and portions of Tennessee and Kentucky. Reyes Coca-Cola delivers 336M+ cases annually to 105K+ customers and employs 10.7K+ employees.

Martin-Brower 
The Martin-Brower Company, LLC (Martin Brower) is a logistics service provider delivering 730M+ cases of food and service products to 25K+ restaurants from 77 facilities. The company serves as the largest supplier worldwide of distribution services to the McDonald's restaurant system. Martin-Brower has distribution operations in 18 countries, including the United States, Australia, Brazil, Canada, Costa Rica, France, Great Britain, Ireland, Kuwait, New Zealand, Panama, Qatar, Singapore, South Korea and the United Arab Emirates. Martin Brower also distributes to Chipotle Mexican Grill, Chick-fil-A, Panera Bread and other restaurants in select US markets.

Others 
Other related operations include businesses involved in transportation management, logistics management, equipment leasing, and real estate acquisition and development. Reyes Holdings owns more than 138 properties in several countries. Reyes Fleet Management maintains 20K+ units across 30+ states making it the 6th largest fleet in the United States.

References

External links

Catering and food service companies of the United States
Privately held companies based in Illinois
Companies based in Cook County, Illinois
Rosemont, Illinois
Coca-Cola bottlers